Aphelele Onke Okuhle Fassi (born 23 January 1998) is a South African professional rugby union player for the  in the United Rugby Championship and the Currie Cup. His regular position is wing or fullback.

References

External links
 

South African rugby union players
Living people
Xhosa people
1998 births
People from Qonce
Rugby union wings
Rugby union fullbacks
Sharks (Currie Cup) players
Sharks (rugby union) players
South Africa international rugby union players
Rugby union players from the Eastern Cape